Hartmut Seifert (born 23 January 1944 in Tilsit (East Prussia) is an influential German labor market and working time researcher, former leader of the  of the Hans Böckler Foundation and scientific correspondent for the Japan Institute for Labour Policy and Training (JILPT), Tokyo.

Life
Hartmut Seifert studied economics at the University of Würzburg and the Free University of Berlin and graduated in 1971 with a degree in economics. In 1983 he received his PhD. rer. pol. from the University of Paderborn. From 1995 to early 2009, he headed the Economic and Social Sciences Institute (WSI) of the Hans Böckler Foundation in Düsseldorf. Since 1990, Seifert has been a corresponding researcher at the Japan Institute for Labor Policy and Training (JILPT), Tokyo. He has had study visits to the United States (Economic Policy Institute, Washington, DC) and Japan (JILPT), and since 2009 he has been a retired independent researcher and policy advisor. From 2012 to 2018 he was a senior research fellow at the WSI of the Hans Böckler Foundation.

Research 
Seifert's research activities cover a wide range of working time and labor market issues. They relate to the organization of working hours, their flexibilization and working time autonomy. He also examines the institutional structure of the labor market, investigates questions of deregulation and flexibilization of forms of employment and their social effects. This also includes work on the relationship between flexibility and social security, on Flexicurity.

Publications (selected)

References

Labor economists
Living people
1944 births